Alphinellus subcornutus is a species of longhorn beetles of the subfamily Lamiinae. It was described by Henry Walter Bates in 1881, and is known from Guatemala, Honduras, and Costa Rica.

References

Beetles described in 1881
Acanthocinini